The 2022 Ulster Senior Football Championship is the 134th installment of the annual Ulster Senior Football Championship organised by Ulster GAA. It is one of the four provincial competitions of the 2022 All-Ireland Senior Football Championship. The winners receive the Anglo-Celt Cup. The draw for the 2022 Ulster Championship was made on 28 November 2021.

Teams
The Ulster championship is contested by the nine county teams in the province of Ulster.

Championship draw

Preliminary round
Two counties were randomly drawn to face each other in the preliminary round. The lowest ranked county to play in the preliminary round was Fermanagh of Division 3.

Quarter-finals
Seven counties were given a bye to this stage and were joined by the preliminary round's winning team. The lowest ranked counties to play in the quarter-finals were Antrim, Cavan and Down of Division 3.

Semi-finals

Final

The winning team advanced to the 2022 All-Ireland SFC, while the losing team advanced to the All-Ireland SFC qualifiers.

See also
 2022 All-Ireland Senior Football Championship
 2022 Connacht Senior Football Championship
 2022 Leinster Senior Football Championship
 2022 Munster Senior Football Championship

Notes

References

External links
 http://ulster.gaa.ie/

2U
2022 in Northern Ireland sport
Ulster Senior Football Championship